There was a by-election for the Glasgow Bridgeton constituency on Thursday 16 November 1961.

The Labour Party candidate, James Bennett managed to retain the seat for his party, with a majority of 6,995 votes.

The by-election was significant, in that it was one of the first elections in which the Scottish National Party achieved a 19% share of the vote; only narrowly beaten by the Unionist candidate M.McNeill for second place.  Although this was not exceptional and did not receive much attention at the time, it was the forerunner of more significant serious success for the SNP later in the 1960s.

References

Glasgow Bridgeton by-election
1960s elections in Scotland
Glasgow Bridgeton by-election
Glasgow Bridgeton by-election
Bridgeton 1961
1960s in Glasgow